The colloquial Egyptian domain name  (meaning "Egypt", romanized as masr) is the internationalized country code top-level domain (IDN ccTLD) in the Domain Name System (DNS) of the Internet for Egypt. Its ASCII DNS name is xn--wgbh1c, obtained by the Internationalizing Domain Names in Applications (IDNA) transcription method.

The domain was one of the first IDN ccTLDs installed in the DNS on 5 May 2010.

Egypt's traditional ccTLD is eg.

The first website of this top-level domain was a site of the Egyptian Ministry of Communication and Information Technology. After the 2011 Egyptian Revolution, a website for a referendum was set up using this domain ( — literally, referendum[of].egypt).

See also
 Top-level domain
 Punycode

References

External links
Dot Masr, Al-Ahram Weekly On-line, 13–19 May 2010
Net milestone: Egypt gets first Arabic domain name, The Times of India, May 7, 2010
Egypt business: Arabic domain name soon a reality, 1 March 2010

Country code top-level domains